Laidley Heights is a rural/residential locality on the outskirts of the town of Laidley in the Lockyer Valley Region, Queensland, Australia.

Geography 
The land use is a mix of larger residential blocks, cropping, and grazing, while some land remains undeveloped. The Bill Gun Dam and Lake Dyer (created by the dam) are within the locality.

History 
The locality was named on 3 June 1994. Its name is derived from the town of Laidley, which in turn was derived from the naming of Laidleys Plain by Allan Cunningham after James Laidley New South Wales Deputy Commissary General.

References 

Lockyer Valley Region
Localities in Queensland